Alex Dias Ribeiro (born in Belo Horizonte, November 7, 1948) is a former racing driver from Brazil. He entered in 20 Formula One World Championship Grands Prix but scored no World Championship points.

Career
After solid graduation from the lower formulae (he placed fifth in the 1976 European Formula Two season), Ribeiro paid for his drive in the March Formula One team for the  season (main sponsors were Caixa Econômica Federal-a Brazilian bank and Souza Cruz-a tobacco company).

However, the season turned into a nightmare. March owner Max Mosley (later FIA president) hired four drivers, and the team simply could not provide for them all. Ribeiro's reputation as a driver suffered.

In 1978, he tried to save his credentials as a racing driver and set up a privately owned F2 team to enter the 1978 European Formula Two season, a year dominated by the March factory team. His car was painted with the words "Jesus Saves". Ribeiro managed to win the Nürburgring round dramatically after favorites Bruno Giacomelli and Marc Surer retired from the race. The rest of the season, however, bore no fruit.

Then, in 1979, the fellow Brazilian Fittipaldi team offered him two chances to qualify a second car, for the Canadian and American Formula One Grands Prix. However, the team was concentrating on former F1 champion Emerson Fittipaldi, and Ribeiro failed to qualify for both events.

Ribeiro was perhaps best known for his proclamation of faith in the form of 'Jesus Saves' slogans on his Formula One cars.

He subsequently went on to perform Chaplaincy at the F1 events he attended as the driver of the Medical Car and is arguably the most accomplished driver in the 'Christians In Motorsport' group.

In 1994, he joined the Brazil national football team as a pastor at the FIFA World Cup in the United States. He held worship services for the team and later wrote a book about the team's journey to victory, titled "Who won the '94 World Cup?" (¿quién Ganó La Copa Mundial?).

At the 2002 Brazilian Grand Prix, Ribeiro was involved in a potentially serious incident. During the morning warm-up on race day Sunday, Enrique Bernoldi crashed his Arrows in Turn 2. When Ribeiro, the driver of the Medical Car, went out to check on Bernoldi, he opened the door to the car. Just as he opened it, Nick Heidfeld came along in his Sauber and smashed into the open door. Both Ribeiro and Heidfeld were uninjured.

In 1981, Ribeiro wrote an autobiographical book called "Mais Que Vencedor" (translation goes something like "More Than A Winner"), in which he names March owner Max Mosley "Mack Mouse" and March engineer Robin Herd "Robin Hood". He owned a motorbike shop in Brasilia where both Nelson Piquet and Roberto Moreno worked as young mechanics, therefore having the unusual distinction that the same shop produced 3 Formula One drivers.

Racing record

Complete European Formula Two Championship results
(key) (Races in bold indicate pole position; races in italics indicate fastest lap)

Complete Formula One World Championship results
(key)

References 

1948 births
Living people
Sportspeople from Belo Horizonte
Brazilian racing drivers
Brazilian Formula One drivers
Hesketh Formula One drivers
March Formula One drivers
Fittipaldi Formula One drivers
Brazilian people of Portuguese descent
European Formula Two Championship drivers
Stock Car Brasil drivers
Brazilian Christians
Top Race V6 drivers